Indiana School for the Blind and Visually Impaired, or ISBVI, established in 1847 as the Indiana School for the Blind and also known as the Indiana Institution for the Education of the Blind, is a residential school for Indiana youth that are blind or have low vision in Indianapolis, USA.  The school was founded in 1847. In 1930 it was relocated to its present location. The school added the "and Visually Impaired" to its name in 2007 and continues to use it today, despite "students who are blind or have low vision" being the currently accepted term.  Students are able to attend the school from pre-school to high school, up to age 22. The current student population is estimated between 150 and 175 students; there are also an equal number of educators, maintenance, outreach, administrators and residential staff. The Lions Clubs of Indiana support the institution as one of their state projects through monetary donations and volunteerism. ISBVI has a youth Lions Club called the Indiana School for the Blind and Visually Impaired Leo Club. Their colors are green and white. Their mascot is the rocket. They play sports such as swimming, cheerleading, wrestling, goalball, and track and field.

Campus
The school has a dormitory.

See also
 Indianapolis Art Center created a section of their ARTSPARK for students at ISBVI
 Circle, a sculpture created by the visually impaired artist Sadashi Inuzuki with the school's students

References

External links

 
 State Project
 Blind Children's Foundation
 Indiana School for the Blind and Visually Impaired Alumni Association

Schools for the blind in the United States
Public schools in Indiana
1847 establishments in Indiana
Educational institutions established in 1847
Schools in Indianapolis
Public K-12 schools in the United States
Public elementary schools in Indiana
Public middle schools in Indiana
Public high schools in Indiana
Public boarding schools in the United States
Boarding schools in Indiana